Shashikant Khurana (born 4 December 1966) is an Indian former cricketer. He played nine first-class matches for Delhi between 1984 and 1987.

See also
 List of Delhi cricketers

References

External links
 

1966 births
Living people
Indian cricketers
Delhi cricketers
Cricketers from Delhi